FMI, The Food Industry Association, is a national trade association for the food industry, especially food retailers and wholesalers, in the USA. FMI's members include approximately 40,000 retail food stores and 25,000 pharmacies, representing an industry with $800 billion in annual sales. The association's focus is on food marketing. It is based in Arlington, Virginia.

History 
The Food Marketing Institute formed in 1977 with the merger of the Super Market Institute and the National Association of Food Chains.

In January 2020, the organization changed its name to FMI – The Food Industry Association to reflect its representation of a broader segment of the food industry.

Political action 
Via its political action committee, FoodPAC, the organization contributes approximately $400,000 per U.S. presidential election, primarily to Republican organizations.

References

External links
 

Food industry trade groups
Food- and drink-related organizations
Business organizations based in the United States
Trade associations based in the United States
Lobbying in the United States
Marketing organizations
Marketing in the United States